Ellis Yarnal Berry (October 6, 1902 – April 1, 1999) was an American attorney, newspaper publisher and politician, elected to the United States House of Representatives from South Dakota.

Early life and education
Berry was born in Larchwood, Iowa, and graduated from Philip High School in Philip, South Dakota.

He was a student at  Morningside College from 1920 through 1922.  He transferred to the University of South Dakota, where he completed his undergraduate work and studied law, graduating with a law degree in 1927.  He was admitted to the bar that same year under diploma privilege.

Career

Berry started his law practice in Kennebec, South Dakota; two years later, he moved to McLaughlin.  He was elected as state's attorney, probate court judge for Corson County, and mayor of McLaughlin. He served as the publisher of the newspaper Mclaughlin Messenger beginning in 1938. He was editor of the State Bar Association Journal from 1938 through 1950.

Politics
Berry was elected to the South Dakota State Senate from 1938 through 1942, a total of two terms.

In 1950, Berry was elected as a Republican to the United States House of Representatives, and reelected nine consecutive times, retiring in 1971. Beginning in 1952, he also published the McIntosh News and Morristown World.

In 1966, journalist Drew Pearson reported that Berry was one of a group of Congressman who had received the "Statesman of the Republic" award from Liberty Lobby for his "right-wing activities". Berry voted in favor of the Civil Rights Acts of 1957, 1960, and 1968, and the Voting Rights Act of 1965, but voted against the Civil Rights Act of 1964 and 24th Amendment to the U.S. Constitution.

After retiring from Congress, Berry he settled in Rapid City, South Dakota.  He lived there until his death in 1999.

Legacy and honors
After retiring from Congress in 1971, he donated his papers to Black Hills State University. The Berry Collection is housed at the E. Y. Berry Library-Learning Center of Black Hills State University and consists of more than 500 boxes of manuscript materials.
BHSU's Library-Learning Center is named for Congressman Berry.

References

Biographical Director of the United States Congress, 1774-1989: Bicentennial Edition. United States: Government Printing Office, 1989. 
E. Y. Berry Library-Learning Center.

External links 

1902 births
1999 deaths
People from Lyon County, Iowa
Morningside University alumni
American newspaper editors
South Dakota state court judges
District attorneys in South Dakota
Politicians from Rapid City, South Dakota
University of South Dakota School of Law alumni
Republican Party members of the South Dakota House of Representatives
Republican Party South Dakota state senators
People from Haakon County, South Dakota
People from Corson County, South Dakota
Mayors of places in South Dakota
Republican Party members of the United States House of Representatives from South Dakota
20th-century American lawyers
Journalists from South Dakota
20th-century American politicians
20th-century American judges
People from Rapid City, South Dakota
20th-century American journalists
American male journalists
Members of the United States House of Representatives from South Dakota